Tatjana Majcen Ljubič is a Paralympian athlete from Slovenia competing mainly in category F54/55 throwing events.

Tatjana has competed in two Paralympics, each time competing in all three throws.  She has won two medals  both in 2004 a silver in the F54/55 javelin and a bronze in the F54/55 shot put.  Her other games in 2008 were ultimately unsuccessful.

External links
 Ljubic&fname=Tatjana&gender=all profile on paralympic.org
 Tatjana Majcen Ljubič izbrala Žiher hišo at Žiher.si

Paralympic athletes of Slovenia
Athletes (track and field) at the 2004 Summer Paralympics
Athletes (track and field) at the 2008 Summer Paralympics
Paralympic silver medalists for Slovenia
Paralympic bronze medalists for Slovenia
Living people
Medalists at the 2004 Summer Paralympics
Year of birth missing (living people)
Paralympic medalists in athletics (track and field)
Slovenian female javelin throwers
Slovenian female shot putters